Echinocardium pennatifidum is a species of sea urchin in the family Loveniidae, chiefly found in the northeast Atlantic region.

Description
It has coarser, more regularly arranged spines than other Echinocardium. The frontal ambulacrum is flush with the front of the heart-shaped test. It has a short labrum, not reaching the second pair of ambulacral plates. The specific name means "cut into the shape of a feather."

Distribution
Found in the waters off Great Britain, Ireland, the North Sea and associated islands.

Ecology

Gallery

References

Spatangoida
Fauna of the North Sea
Fauna of the Isle of Man
Fauna of the British Isles
Animals described in 1868
Taxa named by Alfred Merle Norman